Vaund is a village in Mawal taluka of the Pune district in the state of Maharashtra, India.

Administration
The village is administrated by a sarpanch, an elected representative who leads a gram panchayat. At the time of the 2011 Census of India, the gram panchayat governed three villages and was based in Ghonshet.

Demographics
At the 2011 census, the village comprised 41 households. The population of 225 was split between 118 males and 107 females.

See also
List of villages in Mawal taluka

References

Villages in Mawal taluka